Eudlo Creek is a national park in the south of Palmwoods in the Sunshine Coast Region local government area of South East Queensland, Australia, 85 km north of Brisbane.

456 plant species were discovered in the park, 13 of which are on the list of rare or endangered species.

The vulnerable Tusked frog has been identified within the park.

See also

 Protected areas of Queensland

References

National Parks on the Sunshine Coast, Queensland
Protected areas established in 1951
1951 establishments in Australia